Law enforcement in Croatia is the responsibility of the Croatian Police, which is the national police force of the country subordinated by the Ministry of the Interior of the Republic of Croatia, carrying out certain tasks, the so-called, police activities, laid down by law.

The Police deals with the following affairs: protection of individual life, rights, security and integrity, protection of property, prevention and detection of criminal offences, misdemeanors, violations, search for perpetrators of criminal offences, misdemeanors, violations and their bringing before competent authorities, control and management of road traffic, conducting affairs with aliens, control and security of state border, and other affairs defined by law.

In the operative sense, police affairs are divided into affairs related to public peace and order, affairs related to security of public gatherings, affairs of the border police, affairs of safety of road traffic, affairs of counter-explosive protection, affairs of the criminal police, crime-technical affairs, crime-files affairs, administrative affairs, nationality-related affairs, status questions and asylum, affairs of protection and rescue, inspection affairs and technical affairs.

In recent years, the force has been undergoing a reform with assistance from international agencies, including the Organization for Security and Co-operation in Europe since OSCE Mission to Croatia began there on 18 April 1996, with Croatia being admitted to OSCE on March 24, 1992.

Police powers
Police officers' powers in order to maintain peace in Croatia, such as the power to stop and search, seize property and use force, are regulated. A police officer in Croatia may only stop and search a person if a court has issued a warrant and it is possible that this person has broken the law or is in possession of items or tools which are considered unlawful.

A police officer is only allowed to use firearms if there is an immediate threat to his own life or the lives of other people, to prevent a crime from being committed for which the minimum prison sentence is five years or more, or to prevent the escape of a prisoner caught committing an offence for which the prison sentence is a maximum of ten years.

Organization

The General Police Directorate is an administrative organization of the Ministry of the Interior constituted for conducting police affairs.
The General Police Directorate is responsible for:

 screening and analysis of the state of security and developments leading to the emergence and development of crime;
 harmonization, guidance and supervision over the work of Police Directorates and Police Administrations;
 immediate participation in particular more complex operations of Police Directorates and Police Administrations;
 providing for the implementation of the international agreements on police cooperation and other international acts under the competence of the General Police Directorate;
 organizing and conducting of criminal forensics operations;
 setting the prerequisites for the efficient work of the Police Academy;
 adopting of standards for the equipment and technical means;
 setting the prerequisites for the police readiness to act in the state of emergency.

General Police Directorate is headed by General Police Director.

There are the following organization forms within General Police Directorate:
 Police Directorate (Uprava policije)
 Criminal Police Directorate (Uprava kriminalističke policije)
 Border Police Directorate (Uprava za granicu)
 Command of Special Police (Zapovjedništvo specijalne policije)
 Operational Communication Centre (Operativno–komunikacijski centar policije)
 Forensic Centre (Centar za kriminalistička vještačenja)
 Police Academy (Policijska akademija)
 Special Security Affairs Directorate (Uprava za posebne poslove sigurnosti)

For immediate conducting of police affairs there are 20 Police Administrations (policijske uprave) divided into four categories, which cover the territory of the Republic of Croatia according to the organization of units of local self-government (counties or županije).

Police stations are established for direct police and other affairs in each Police Administration.

Border control
Croatia has had an external border with the Schengen area since the accession of the country to the EU. As part of the major migration movements from 2015, Croatia became part of the so-called Balkan route. The European Border Agency Frontex has a small mission in Croatia to assist the police at various border crossings. In July 2018 Frontex organized the air reconnaissance of the border with Bosnia with a reconnaissance aircraft as part of the Frontex 'Multipurpose Aerial Surveillance (MAS). The aircraft transmit moving images of remote sensing cameras in real time to the Frontex Situation Center (FSC) in Warszawa.

Critics 
For several times  NGOs report, that the Croatian police illegally and arbitrarily deport refugees to Bosnia-Herzegovina, ie from the EU (push-backs). It would come again and again to attacks by the Croatian officials to the refugees.

Ranks

Regular Police (Temeljna policija)

Intervention Police (Interventna policija)

Special Police (Specijalna policija)

Weapons
MP5
UZI Uses Copy of the Mini-Uzi variant manufactured as Mini ERO 
G36C
CZ75
HS2000
H&K UMP
H&K MP7
H&K 417

Equipment

Since 2013, there were special efforts by the Ministry of the Interior to equip the Croatian police with new vehicles and uniforms. Police cars consist mainly of mostly Škoda Octavias, 4-door Opel Astras, some Citroën C-Elysées and, more prominently, Ford Focuses (unmarked sedans and marked estates).

Helicopters

Controversies 

According to human rights organizations, Croatian police has been accused of overt and, generally unpunished, brutality. Amnesty international has issued a detailed report on the allegations of torture of refugees and migrants, while the Human Rights Watch has criticized the organization impunity of violence and unlawful pushbacks at their borders.

In 2021, the Border Violence Monitoring Network published a report into the use of torture and inhuman treatment during pushbacks by Croatian police. They assert that:

 87% of pushbacks carried out by Croatian authorities contained one or more forms of violence and abuse that we assert amounts to torture or inhuman treatment
 Unmuzzled police dogs were encouraged by Croatian officers to attack people who were detained
 Croatian officers forcibly undressed people, setting fire to their clothes and pushed them back across international borders in a complete state of undress

See also 
Croatian special police order of battle in 1991–95
Ministry of the Interior (Croatia)
USKOK
United Nations Civilian Police Support Group

Notes

External links

 Police / Ministry of Interior of the Republic of Croatia